The 1902 Texas gubernatorial election was held to elect the Governor of Texas. S. W. T. Lanham was elected over Republican George W. Burkett in a landslide.

General election

Candidates
George Washington Carroll, Beaumont alderman and lumber and oil businessman (Prohibition)
George Washington Burkett, banker and businessman (Republican)
Walter Freeman (Socialist)
S. W. T. Lanham, U.S. Representative from Weatherford and candidate for Governor in 1894 (Democratic)
J. M. Mallett (Populist)
G. H. Royal, perennial nominee (Socialist Labor)

Results

References

1902
Texas
1902 Texas elections